Piedra libre is a 1976 Argentine film.

Cast
 Marilina Ross as Eugenia Alonso
 Juan José Camero as Ezequiel Labourdé
 Mecha Ortiz as Amalia Pradere
 Luisina Brando as Amalita
 Flora Steinberg as Mercedes Alonso
 Enrique Alonso as Vicente
 Francisco de Paula as Plácido Alonso
 Adriana Parets as Vicente's wife
 Jorge Petraglia as Carancho
 Walter Soubrie as Tordo

References

External links
 

1976 films
Argentine drama films
1970s Spanish-language films
Films directed by Leopoldo Torre Nilsson
1970s Argentine films